Kullachar Nanjundachar, popularly known as K. P. Nanjundi is an Indian politician and businessman serving as the state vice president of Bharatiya Janata Party, Karnataka since 2017 and a member of Karnataka Legislative Council from 18 June 2018. He is the state president of Akhila Karnataka Vishwakarma Mahasabha. He is the owner of Sri Lakshmi Golds Palace jewellery chain and also the owner of TV1 Kannada news channel. Nanjundi, a former Congress leader, joined Bharatiya Janata Party in 2017. He is the owner of Sri Lakshmi Golds Palace jewellery chain.

Early life
Hailing from poor family in Vinoba Nagar in Bangalore, Nanjundi was born as Kullachar Nanjundachar, the fourth of eight siblings. He cleared XIIth exam with a first class. But since his father's death resulted in further financial problems, Nanjundi had to work his father's job in the day and plied an auto rickshaw at night, using the time in between to attend an evening college.

Business
Nanjundi is the owner of the Sri Lakshmi Golds Palace, a chain of jewellery shops, which has branches in Bangalore, Mangalore, Hubli and Belgaum.

References

1960s births
Bharatiya Janata Party politicians from Karnataka
Living people
Year of birth missing (living people)